Chant funèbre may refer to:

Chant funèbre (fr), Op. 9 Albéric Magnard
Chant funèbre (Stravinsky) (Погребальная песня; Funeral Song), 1908 orchestral work by Igor Stravinsky
Chant funèbre a la memoire des jeunes femmes defuntes, Op.37 by Charles Koechlin
Chant funèbre, List of compositions and literary works by Hector Berlioz
Chant funèbre for cello and orchestra, (1926) Albert Huybrechts
Chant funèbre à la Mémoire de Féraud, Étienne Méhul
Chant funèbre, by Jacques Stehman
Choeur (Quelques mesure de chant funèbre), 1864 Rossini
:fr:Chant funèbre d'une mère..., French revolutionary song

See also
Funeral Song (disambiguation)